Colonial Council elections were held in French Cochinchina on 3 March 1935.

Electoral system
The 24 members of the Colonial Council consisted of ten members elected by French citizens, ten by Vietnamese who were classed as French subjects, two by the Chamber of Commerce and two by the Chamber of Agriculture.

Results
Amongst the Vietnamese electorate, the La Lutte group received 17% of the vote, although they failed to win a seat.

References

1935 in Vietnam
1935
Cochinchina
March 1935 events